The 2017–18 Algerian Ligue Professionnelle 1 was the 56th season of the Algerian Ligue Professionnelle 1 since its establishment in 1962. A total of 16 teams contested the league.

Teams

Stadiums
Note: Table lists in alphabetical order.
All Derby matches between CR Belouizdad, MC Alger, NA Hussein Dey, USM Alger, USM El Harrach and Paradou AC will be played on July 5, 1962 Stadium which seats 64,000 spectators.

Personnel and kits

Managerial changes

Managerial changes during the 2017-18 campaign.

Pre-season

During the season

Foreign players
This season saw the cancellation of the law on the recruitment of foreign players.

Season statistics

Results

League table

Result table

Positions by round

Clubs season-progress

Top scorers

Updated to games played on 19 May 2018 Source: soccerway.com

Hat-tricks

Clean sheets

* Only goalkeepers who played all 90 minutes of a match are taken into consideration.
Updated to games played on 4 February 2017

Media coverage

See also
2017–18 Algerian Ligue Professionnelle 2
2017–18 Algerian Cup

Notes

References

Algerian Ligue Professionnelle 1 seasons
Algeria
1